Georg Sanders was a Russian figure skater. He won the bronze medal in men's single skating at the first World Figure Skating Championships, held in 1896 in Saint Petersburg.

Competitive highlights

References 

Russian male single skaters
Year of birth missing
Year of death missing